Servicio Aereo Regional Cia Ltda., marketed as Aeroregional, is a regional airline from Ecuador with its hub in Mariscal Lamar International Airport, in the city of Cuenca.

Destinations

Fleet

As of July 2021, Aeroregional's fleet currently consists of the following aircraft:

See also
List of airlines of Ecuador

References

Airlines of Ecuador
Airlines established in 2018
2018 establishments in Ecuador